Kannadiga is a 2021 Indian Kannada-language period drama film written and directed by B.M. Giriraj. The film is produced by N.S.Rajkumar under the banner Omkaar Movies. It features V. Ravichandran and Paavana Gowda in the lead roles. The supporting cast includes Achyuth Kumar and Jeevika. The score and soundtrack for the film is by Ravi Basrur and the cinematography is by G.S.V.Seetharram. The film owing to the COVID -19 pandemic was released directly on ZEE5.

Cast 

 V. Ravichandran as Gunabhadra
 Paavana Gowda as Gunabhadra's wife
 Jeevika as Hena
 Balaji Manohar
 Jagadish Mythri
 Achyuth Kumar as Harigopala
 Chi. Guru Dutt
 Jamie Alter as Reverend Ferdinand Kittel
 Rachanaa G N as Tunga

Soundtrack 

The film's background score and the soundtracks are composed by Ravi Basrur. The music rights were acquired by Anand Audio.

Production and Release 
The filming of the film began in later mid-2020 and had wrapped by early 2021. The film had Ravichandran as a lead and Pavana Gowda as the female lead on board. The film also had Balaji Manohar playing the pivotal character in film. The film was slated to release in the theaters initially in April 2021 but later owing to the COVID-19 pandemic it skipped the theatrical release and was released directly on the streaming platform ZEE5 on 17 December 2021.

Reception 
The film received a mixed response from both critics and the audience and failed to impress the audience.

The Times Of India gave 3/5 and stated "Kannadiga is a film that is pertinent and worth a watch for those who like this genre. The length could get the better of you, but it is an earnest film if you persist."

The New Indian Express gave 3/5 and stated "If the Kannada language is thriving even today, it is all because of the sacrifices made by the scriptwriters in the past, who have managed to preserve the Kannada work, and culture for generations now. And Kannadiga is important documentation that showcases the love of our mother tongue."

References

External links 

 

2021 films
ZEE5 original films
2020s Kannada-language films
Films shot in Mysore
Films shot in Bangalore
Films directed by B. M. Giriraj